On 28 April 2010, the Ministry of Road Transport and Highways officially published a new numbering system for the National Highway network in the Gazette of the Government of India. It is a systematic numbering scheme based on the orientation and the geographic location of the highway. This was adopted to ensure more flexibility and consistency in the numbering of existing and new national highways.

As per the new numbering system:
 All north-south oriented highways will have even numbers increasing from the east to the west.
 All east-west oriented highways will have odd numbers increasing from the north to the south.
 All major Highways will be single digit or double digit in number.
 Three-digit numbered highways are secondary routes or branches of a main highway. The secondary route number is prefixed to the number of the main highway. For example 244, 344 etc. will be the branches of the main NH44.
 Suffixes A, B, C, D etc. are added to the three-digit sub highways to indicate very small spin-offs or stretches of sub-highways.

List of National Highways

National Highways Summary

See also 
 List of National Highways in India by state
 List of National Highways in India by union territory
 List of National Highways in India by old highway number

References

External links
 New NH Notification
 OSM NH list
 MORTH NH list

National highways in India
National Highways